The Angelus is an oil painting by French painter Jean-François Millet, completed between 1857 and 1859.

The painting depicts two peasants bowing in a field over a basket of potatoes to say a prayer, the Angelus, that together with the ringing of the bell from the church on the horizon marks the end of a day's work.

Millet was commissioned by the American would-be painter and art collector Thomas Gold Appleton, who never came to collect it. The painting is famous today for driving the prices for artworks of the Barbizon school up to record amounts in the late 19th century.

History
Millet said: "The idea for The Angelus came to me because I remembered that my grandmother, hearing the church bell ringing while we were working in the fields, always made us stop work to say the Angelus prayer for the poor departed." Completed between 1857 and 1859, it is an oil painting on canvas. When Appleton failed to take possession, Millet added a steeple and changed the initial title of the work, Prayer for the Potato Crop, to The Angelus.

It depicts two peasants during the potato harvest in Barbizon, with a view of the church tower of Chailly-en-Bière. At their feet is a small basket of potatoes, and around them a cart and a pitchfork. Various interpretations of the relationship between the two peasants have been made, such as colleagues at work, husband and wife pair, or (as Gambetta interpreted it) farmer and maidservant. An 1889 sales catalogue described them simply as "a young peasant and his companion." Millet sold The Angelus after his The Gleaners was sold at the Salon in 1857. About half the size, it brought him less than half the amount for which he sold The Gleaners. The Angelus was eventually shown the year before Millet's death in Brussels in 1874, where it was greatly admired by Léon Gambetta.

Much later, Salvador Dalí saw a print of this painting in his school and insisted that this was a funeral scene, not a prayer ritual and that the couple were portrayed praying and mourning over their dead infant. Although this was an unpopular view, at his insistence the Louvre X-rayed the painting, showing a small painted-over geometric shape strikingly similar to a coffin by the basket. It seems possible that Millet originally painted a burial – perhaps a rural version of Courbet's famous painting A Burial at Ornans (1850) – but then converted it to a recitation of the Angelus, complete with a visible church bell tower.

Commentary
At first, the painting was interpreted as a political statement, with Millet viewed as a socialist in solidarity with the workers.
While the painting expresses a profound sense of religious devotion, and became one of the most widely reproduced religious paintings of the 19th century, with prints displayed by thousands of devout householders across France, Millet painted it from a sense of nostalgia rather than from any strong religious feeling. According to Karine Huguenaud, "There is, however, no religious message to the painting: Millet was simply concerned with portraying a ritualised moment of meditation taking place as the dusk rolls in." In 1864 Belgian minister Jules Van Praët exchanged it for Millet's Bergère avec son troupeau (Shepherd and her flock) and commented dryly, "What can I say? It is clearly a masterpiece, but faced with these two peasants, whose work is interrupted by prayer, everyone thinks they can hear the nearby church bell tolling, and in the end, the constant ringing just became tiresome".

Provenance
The painting triggered a rush of patriotic fervour when the Louvre tried to buy it in 1889, and was vandalized by a madman in 1932. 
 
With reference to the Musée d'Orsay, the provenance of the work is as follows; although some events are missing, such as the Brussels show in 1874:
1860 owned by Belgian landscape painter Victor de Papeleu who bought it for 1,000 francs; 
1860 owned by Alfred Stevens, who paid 2,500 fr.;
1860 owned by Jules Van Praët, Brussels;
1864 Paul Tesse obtained it by exchanging it for La Grande bergère (Shepherdess and flock) by Millet;
1865 owned by Emile Gavet, Paris;
By 1881, collection John Waterloo Wilson, avenue Hoche, Paris; his sale at hôtel Drouot, 16 March 1881;
16 March 1881, Eugène Secrétan, a French art collector and copper industrialist who donated copper for the Statue of Liberty, bidding against M. Dofœr, for 168,000 fr., with fees;
Secrétan sale (63), 1 July 1889, galerie Sedelmeyer, Paris  bidding war between the Louvre (Antonin Proust) and the American Art Association; James F. Sutton drives the sale price to 553,000 francs;
1889–1890, collection American Art Association, New York; sale 1890 to the Paris collector and philanthropist, Hippolyte François Alfred Chauchard (1821–1909), for 750,000 fr.;
1890–1909, collection Alfred Chauchard;
1909: Chauchard bequest of 1906 to the French State; formally accepted 15 January 1910 into the permanent collection of the musée du Louvre, Paris;
1986 transferred to the permanent collection of musée d'Orsay, Paris.

Legacy
A month after the Secretan sale, The Gleaners was sold for 300,000 francs, and the contrast between the auction prices of Millet's paintings on the art market and the value of Millet's estate for his surviving family led to the droit de suite (French for "right to follow"), a French law that compensates artists or their heirs when artworks are resold.

The imagery of The Angelus with peasants praying was a popular sentimental 19th-century religious subject.  Generations later, Salvador Dalí had seen a reproduction of it on the wall of his childhood school and claimed to have been spooked by the painting. He felt the basket looked like the coffin of a child and the woman looked like a praying mantis. He was inspired to create his paranoiac-critical paintings The Architectonic Angelus of Millet and Gala and the Angelus of Millet Preceding the Imminent Arrival of the Conical Anamorphoses in 1933. These were followed two years later by a similar pair of paintings which included a partial reproduction of Millet's The Angelus, called The Angelus of Gala and Archaeological Reminiscence of Millet's Angelus. In 1938, he published a book Le Mythe tragique de l'Angélus de Millet.

In 2018, Gil Baillie wrote that The Angelus incorporates a sensibility of the sacramental that made reproductions of the painting especially popular in Western Europe throughout much of the remainder of the 19th century. He incorporates a story that illustrates the role of imagination in the appeal of the image: "When his lifelong friend and agent Alfred Sensier first saw the painting on Millet’s easel, the artist asked: 'Well, what do you think of it?' 'It’s the Angelus,' acknowledged Sensier. To which Millet replied: 'Can you hear the bells?'" Baillie, acknowledging the effect of The Angelus on Dali's art, suggests that the latter artist's reaction is a manifestation of the sacramental meaning of the piece.

In Jean-Pierre Melville's French drama film Léon Morin, Priest (1961) there is a scene in which a conversation between the atheist French widow Barny (Emmanuelle Riva) and the priest Léon Morin (Jean-Paul Belmondo) is interrupted by the sound of church bells. Barny in her first-person narration states, "The Angelus rang. He'd have to enact a scene from a Millet painting or not answer the call of the church. Appear ridiculous or inadequate." Morin proceeds to pray the Angelus in front of Barny.

The painting can also be frequently seen on the Taylor family's living room wall in several episodes of The Andy Griffith Show.

See also

1859 in art

Notes

References

External links
L'Angelus on Smarthistory

1859 paintings
Paintings in the collection of the Musée d'Orsay
Landscape paintings
Paintings by Jean-François Millet
Paintings of people
Realism (art movement)
Seine-et-Marne
Religious paintings
Farming in art
Vandalized works of art